Supernaturalistic is the debut album by Sander van Doorn. It was released in March 2008.

The first single from the album, "The Bass" was released on February 18 of the same year.

Reception

With the release of the album, On April 4, 2008; Tiësto presented a special program for Sander van Doorn, on show 54 Tiësto's Club Life on Radio 538. The playlist included "Look Inside Your Head", "Riff", "15", "The Bass", "Grasshopper", and "Dozer".

Track listing

References

2008 debut albums
Sander van Doorn albums